Write This Down is the debut album by the American Christian rock band, Write This Down. The album marks the band's debut on their first record label, Tooth & Nail Records.  Write This Down contains a revised version of the song, "Alarm the Alarm," which was the name of the band's first EP. The first version was on their independently released EP, Write This Down. This album peaked at No. 45 on the Christian Albums chart published by Billboard.

Track listing

Music videos 

 "Alarm the Alarm"
 "Renegade"

Personnel 

 Johnny Collier – lead vocals
 Nick Lombardo – bass
 Chad Nichols – drums
 Nate Rockwell – guitars, backing vocals

Additional personnel
Rob Hawkins – producer, engineer
Ben Phillips – drum engineer
David Bendeth – mixing
Ainslie Grosser – mixing
Troy Glessner – mastering
Caleb Kuhl – photography
Ryan Clark – design

References 

2010 debut albums
Write This Down (band) albums